Annelise Coberger (born 16 September 1971) is a New Zealand former alpine skier. Born in Christchurch, she became the first person from the Southern Hemisphere to win a medal at the Winter Olympics when she won silver in the slalom at Albertville in France in 1992. For this success, at the annual Halberg Awards she was awarded the title of New Zealand Sportsman of the Year. Coberger also competed at the 1994 Winter Olympics in Lillehammer but did not finish her first run of the slalom. Coberger remained the only Winter Olympic medalist from New Zealand for 26 years until Zoi Sadowski-Synnott won bronze in the women's big air at the 2018 Winter Olympics in Pyeongchang.

Coberger won one World Cup slalom and reached seven other World Cup podiums. In the 1992–93 season, she was the runner-up in the Slalom World Cup with just 6 points behind the winner Vreni Schneider. Coberger finished competing at an international level a couple of years after her Olympic success (her last World Cup race was in March 1995). She then joined the New Zealand Police. She has two daughters, born in 2002 and 2004.

World Cup victories

References

dataOlympics profile.  Accessed 17 June 2007.
profile with history and pictures.  Accessed 17 June 2007.
New Zealand Historic Places Trust - The Cobergers

External links
 
 
 
 

1971 births
Living people
Alpine skiers at the 1992 Winter Olympics
Alpine skiers at the 1994 Winter Olympics
Olympic silver medalists for New Zealand
Olympic alpine skiers of New Zealand
New Zealand female alpine skiers
Sportspeople from Christchurch
Olympic medalists in alpine skiing
New Zealand police officers
Medalists at the 1992 Winter Olympics
Women police officers
New Zealand people of German descent
20th-century New Zealand women